Christmas with Glen Campbell may refer to:

 Christmas with Glen Campbell (1971 album)
 Christmas with Glen Campbell (1995 album)
 Christmas with Glen Campbell (video)